Rieser is a surname of German origin. It may refer to the following people:

 Dolf Rieser (1898–1983) - British painter and printmaker
 Leonard M. Rieser (1922–1998) - American physicist
 Michael Rieser (1828–1905) - Austrian painter
 Samuel Maximilian Rieser (1893–1981) - Jewish lawyer and philosopher
 Verena Rieser (born 1979), German computer scientist

Other 
 Rieser Mill was listed on the National Register of Historic Places in 1990.
 Rieser-Shoemaker Farm was listed on the National Register of Historic Places in 1992.

See also 
 Reiser (disambiguation)
 Ries (disambiguation)
 Riser (disambiguation)